Yoho National Park is a national park of Canada. It is located within the Rocky Mountains along the western slope of the Continental Divide of the Americas in southeastern British Columbia, bordered by Kootenay National Park to the south and Banff National Park to the east in Alberta. The word Yoho is a Cree expression of amazement or awe, and it is an apt description for the park's spectacular landscape of massive ice fields and mountain peaks, which rank among the highest in the Canadian Rockies.

Together, these parks form the Canadian Rocky Mountain Parks World Heritage Site. Yoho's administrative and visitor centre is located in Field, British Columbia, beside the Trans-Canada Highway.

History
Yoho National Park is located in the traditional territories of the Secwepemc and Ktunaxa First Nations. Before the establishment of the park, the Ktunaxa primarily used the area—specifically, Kicking Horse Pass—to cross the Rockies in order to access bison hunting grounds on the eastern side of the mountains.
The park was created following a trip by Prime Minister John A. Macdonald and his wife Agnes through the Rockies on the newly completed Canadian Pacific Railway, Canada's first transcontinental. After his return to Ottawa, Yoho National Park was created on October 10, 1886. Glacier National Park was created on the same day, making Yoho and Glacier the second and third national parks in the country, after Rocky Mountains Park (now named Banff National Park).

The contiguous national parks of Banff, Jasper, Kootenay, and Yoho, as well as the Mount Robson, Mount Assiniboine, and Hamber provincial parks, were declared a UNESCO World Heritage Site in 1984.

Fauna
Common species of animals that roam in this park are the timber wolf, coyote, badger, moose, elk, mule deer, mountain goat, golden-mantled ground squirrel, rufous hummingbird, hoary marmot, wolverine, cougar, pika, lynx, grizzly bear, and black bear.

Climate
The weather in the park is localized and changeable. Located on the western side of the continental divide, it receives more precipitation than areas east of the divide. Precipitation in the park increases with elevation. The coldest weather usually occurs in the months December to February. Snowfall and freezing temperatures can occur during the summertime at altitudes above .

Geology

The Kicking Horse River, a Canadian Heritage River, originates in the Wapta and Waputik icefields in the park. This river has created a natural bridge through solid rock.

The Canadian Rockies consist of sedimentary rock, with numerous fossil deposits.  In particular, the Burgess Shale, located in Yoho National Park, has among the world's richest deposits of rare fossils.  The Burgess Shale was discovered in 1909 by Charles Doolittle Walcott. In the southeastern corner of the park is an igneous intrusion known as the Ice River Complex containing deposits of sodalite, an ornamental stone.

Mountains

Mount Goodsir 
Mount Vaux 
Mount Balfour 
Chancellor Peak  
Mount Stephen  is the tallest of the four mountains that surround the town of Field, British Columbia. A portion of the Burgess Shale fossils were discovered on Mount Stephen.
Cathedral Mountain 
The President 
Odaray Mountain 
The Vice President	
Wapta Mountain 
Mount Field 
Mount Burgess  is a frequently climbed mountain. For 17 years, it was featured on the Canadian ten-dollar bill.
Paget Peak

Waterfalls

Its average flow can reach .

See also

List of lakes in Yoho National Park
List of national parks of Canada
Emerald Lake

References

External links

A travel guide for Yoho National Park and the village of Field, BC
"Yoho National Park". The Canadian Encyclopedia

Wikipedia Student Program
 
Parks in British Columbia
National parks in British Columbia
Protected areas established in 1886
Articles containing video clips